The Stanford Cardinal men's gymnastics team represents Stanford University and competes in the Mountain Pacific Sports Federation.  The team has won 8 NCAA National Championships, most recently in 2022.

Top NCAA Championship finishes

Roster

Coaching staff

NCAA champions

Athlete awards

Nissen-Emery Award winners 

 Steve Hug (1974)
 Josh Stein (1995)
 Dan Gill (2004)
 Eddie Penev (2013)
 Akash Modi (2017)
 Brody Malone (2022)

CGA Rookie of the Year 
 Brody Malone (2019)
 Brandon Briones (2020)

CGA Specialist of the Year 
 Curran Phillips (2022)

MPSF Gymnast of the Year 
 Dan Gill (2004)
 Sho Nakamori (2009)
 Tim Gentry (2011)
 Akash Modi (2014, 2015, 2016, 2017)
 Brody Malone (2019, 2020, 2021, 2022)

Past Olympians 

 Steve Hug (1972, 1976)
 Jair Lynch (1992, 1996) 
 Josh Stein (1996 alternate)
 David Durante (2008 alternate)
 Akash Modi (2016 alternate, 2020 alternate)
 Brody Malone (2020)
 Brandon Briones (2020 alternate)

References 

Stanford Cardinal men's gymnastics
College men's gymnastics teams in the United States